Willie Burke (born 4 September 1972 in Dublin) is an Irish former footballer.

He made his League of Ireland debut for Shamrock Rovers at home to Waterford United at the RDS Arena on 8 November 1992. In July 1993 he was part of a Rovers side that won an International Football Festival in Manchester.

In his second season at the club he won the League scoring once in 30 league appearances as well as making two appearances in European competition.

He signed for St Patrick's Athletic F.C. in 1995 where he stayed for eight seasons winning a further 3 League titles.

Honours
 League of Ireland: 4
 Shamrock Rovers 1993/94
St Patrick's Athletic F.C. 1995–96, 1997–98, 1998–99
 League of Ireland Cup: 1
 St Patrick's Athletic F.C. 2000/01
FAI Super Cup: 1
 St Patrick's Athletic F.C. 1999
Leinster Senior Cup: 1
 St Patrick's Athletic F.C. 2000
LFA President's Cup: 1
 St Patrick's Athletic F.C. 1996/97
SRFC Young Player of the Year:
 Shamrock Rovers – 1990/91

Sources 
 The Hoops by Paul Doolan and Robert Goggins

Living people
1972 births
Republic of Ireland association footballers
Shamrock Rovers F.C. players
St Patrick's Athletic F.C. players
League of Ireland players
Association footballers from Dublin (city)
Association football fullbacks